Rubinacci is an Italian luxury clothing company founded in Naples, Italy in 1932 by Gennaro Rubinacci under the name of the London House. The idea Rubinacci had was to create unstructured, unlined jackets meant to be worn outside of the office. Among his early clients were filmmaker Vittorio De Sica and journalist Curzio Malaparte.

History
The history of Rubinacci began with art collector Gennaro Rubinacci's own tailoring emporium; he opened London House, at 25 Via Filangieri. In 1961, Gennaro's son, Mariano, took control of the company. In 1963, he changed its name to Rubinacci, maintaining the initials of the original name in the logo. Later, a branch was opened in Milan, in 1989, and in London in 2005.

As of 2018, Luca Rubinacci, Gennaro's grandson, is the creative director of Rubinacci, and responsible for launching the firm's ready-to-wear line. He is considered a particularly stylish dresser.

Exhibitions and exhibits
Mariano Rubinacci established a museum of Neapolitan tailoring in Naples, featuring clothes from the 1930s, which has occasionally loaned items to the FIT in New York, and had an exhibition at the Victoria and Albert Museum in 2014.

See also
 Italian fashion
 Made in Italy

References

External links 
 
 

Companies based in Naples
Italian companies established in 1932
Clothing brands of Italy
Clothing companies established in 1932
Fashion accessory brands
High fashion brands
Luxury brands
Menswear designers
Privately held companies of Italy
Italian suit makers